The GP Ayuntamiento de Bilbao was a road bicycle race held annually in the Basque Country, Spain from 1945 until 1969. It was held as a stage race from 1943 to 1955 and as a one-day race from 1960 to 1964.

Winners

References

Cycle races in Spain
Recurring sporting events established in 1943
1943 establishments in Spain
Cycle races in the Basque Country
1964 disestablishments in Spain
Defunct cycling races in Spain
Recurring sporting events disestablished in 1964